Parrot was a register-based process virtual machine designed to run dynamic languages efficiently. It is possible to compile Parrot assembly language and Parrot intermediate representation (PIR, an intermediate language) to Parrot bytecode and execute it. Parrot is free and open source software.

Parrot was started by the Perl community and is developed with help from the open source and free software communities. As a result, it is focused on license compatibility with Perl (Artistic License 2.0), platform compatibility across a broad array of systems, processor architecture compatibility across most modern processors, speed of execution, small size (around 700k depending on platform), and the flexibility to handle the varying demands made by Raku and other modern dynamic languages.

Version 1.0, with a stable application programming interface (API) for development, was released on March 17, 2009. The last version is release 8.1.0 "Andean Parakeet". Parrot was officially discontinued in August 2021, after being supplanted by MoarVM in its main use (Raku) and never becoming a mainstream VM for any of its other supported languages.

History
The name Parrot came from an April Fool's joke which announced a hypothetical language, named Parrot, that would unify Python and Perl. The name was later adopted by this project (initially a part of the Raku development effort) which aims to support Raku, Python, and other programming languages. Several languages are being ported to run on the Parrot virtual machine.

The Parrot Foundation was dissolved in 2014. The Foundation was created in 2008 to hold the copyright and trademarks of the Parrot project, to help drive development of language implementations and the core codebase, to provide a base for growing the Parrot community, and to reach out to other language communities.

Languages
The goal of the Parrot virtual machine is to host client languages and allow inter-operation between them. Several hurdles exist in accomplishing this goal, in particular the difficulty of mapping high-level concepts, data, and data structures between languages.

Static and dynamic languages
The differing properties of statically and dynamically typed languages have motivated the design of Parrot. Current popular virtual machines such as the Java virtual machine and the Common Language Runtime, for the .NET platform, have been designed for statically typed languages, while the languages targeted by Parrot are dynamically typed.

Virtual machines such as the Java virtual machine and the current Perl 5 virtual machine are also stack based. Parrot developers see Parrot's inclusion of registers as an advantage, as it therefore more closely resembles a hardware design, allowing the vast literature on compiler optimization to be used in generating bytecode for the Parrot virtual machine that could run at speeds closer to machine code. Other register-based virtual machines have inspired parts of Parrot's design, including LLVM, the Lua VM and Inferno's Dis.

Functional concepts
Parrot has rich support for several features of functional programming including closures and continuations, both of which can be particularly difficult to implement correctly and portably, especially in conjunction with exception handling and threading. The biggest advantage is the dynamic extendability of objects with methods, which allows for polymorphic containers (PMCs) and associated opcodes. Implementing solutions to these problems at the virtual machine level obviates the need to solve these problems in the individual client languages.

Compiler tools
 

Parrot provides a suite of compiler-writing tools which includes the Parser Grammar Engine (PGE), a hybrid parser-generator that can express a recursive descent parser as well as an operator-precedence parser, allowing free transition between the two in a single grammar. The PGE feeds into the Tree Grammar Engine (TGE) which further transforms the parse-tree generated by PGE for optimization and ultimately for code generation.

Existing client languages
Many languages already have compiler front-ends designed for Parrot; however, many of them are still only partially functional. As of July 2013 , actively maintained languages are:

 C (C99 "dialect")
 Java
 Java bytecode
 Joy
 Lua
 MiniPerl (Perl 1.0)
 NQP (Not Quite Perl)
 Perl 5
 PHP (via Pipp)
 Python (via pynie)
 Raku (via Rakudo)
 Ruby (via Cardinal)
 Scheme
 The "squaak" tutorial language
 Tcl (via partcl)
 WMLScript

Inactive languages, as of July 2013, are the following:

 Arc
 APL
 bc
 Common Lisp
 Lisp
 ECMAScript
 Forth
 Generic Imperative Language
 GNU m4
 Jako
 Octave
 QuickBASIC 4.5
 Smalltalk (via Chitchat)
 .NET bytecode

The following esoteric programming languages have also been implemented:

 Befunge
 Brainfuck
 HQ9 Plus
 Lazy K
 LOLCODE
 Ook!
 Shakespeare
 Unlambda

Internals
There are three forms of program code for Parrot:
  Bytecode is binary and is natively interpreted by Parrot. Bytecode is usually stored in files with the filename extension ".pbc".
 Parrot assembly language (PASM) is the low level language that compiles down to bytecode. PASM code is usually stored in files with the filename extension ".pasm".
 Parrot intermediate representation (PIR) is a slightly higher level language than PASM and also compiles down to bytecode. It is the primary target of language implementations. PIR transparently manages Parrot's inter-routine calling conventions, provides improved syntax, register allocation, and more. PIR code is usually stored in files with the filename extension ".pir".

Examples

Registers
Parrot is register-based like most hardware CPUs, and unlike most virtual machines, which are stack-based. Parrot provides four types of registers:

 I: native integer type
 N: floating-point numbers
 S: advanced string registers with Unicode support
 P: PMC, or Polymorphic Container — Parrot object type

Parrot provides an arbitrary number of registers; this number is fixed at compile time per subroutine.

Arithmetic operations
In PASM
    set I1, 4
    inc I1        # I1 is now 5
    add I1, 2     # I1 is now 7
    set N1, 42.0
    dec N1        # N1 is now 41.0
    sub N1, 2.0   # N1 is now 39.0
    print I1
    print ', '
    print N1
    print "\n"
    end
In PIR
 .sub 'main' :main
    $I1 = 4
    inc $I1     # $I1 is now 5
    $I1 += 2    # $I1 is now 7
    $N1 = 42.0
    dec $N1     # $N1 is now 41.0
    $N1 -= 2.0  # $N1 now 39.0
    print $I1
    print ', '
    print $N1
    print "\n"
 .end

Development
Until late 2005, Dan Sugalski was the lead designer and chief architect of Parrot.  Chip Salzenberg, a longtime Perl, Linux kernel, and C++ hacker, took over until mid-2006, when he became the lead developer. Allison Randal, the lead developer of Punie and chief architect of Parrot's compiler tools, was the chief architect until mid-October 2010 when she stepped down and chose Christoph Otto as the new chief architect.

Development discussions take place primarily on the #parrot channel on irc.perl.org. In addition, there are weekly moderated meetings for Parrot and language developers hosted in #parrotsketch on the same network. Much discussion also occurs on the parrot-dev mailing list, hosted by parrot.org.

Design discussions exist in the form of Parrot Design Documents, or PDDs, in the Parrot repository. The chief architect or another designated designer produces these documents to explain the philosophy of a feature as well as its interface and design notes. Parrot hackers turn these documents into executable tests, and then existing features.

The Parrot team releases a new stable version of the software on the third Tuesday of every month. Core committers take turns producing releases in a revolving schedule, where no single committer is responsible for multiple releases in a row.

See also

 GraalVM
 Common Language Runtime (CLR)
 Comparison of application virtual machines
 mod_parrot
 Da Vinci Machine

References

External links
 
 Perl 6 and Parrot links

Cross-platform software
Free compilers and interpreters
Free software programmed in C
Perl
Register-based virtual machines
Software using the Artistic license
Discontinued software